Cameroon competed at the 2015 African Games held in Brazzaville, Republic of the Congo.

Medal summary

Medal table

Football 

Cameroon won the silver medal in the women's tournament.

Judo 

Hélène Wezeu Dombeu won the gold medal in the women's 63 kg event.

Wrestling 

Cameroon won several medals in wrestling.

References 

Nations at the 2015 African Games
2015
African Games